Gandipet is a village in Ranga Reddy district of the Indian state of Telangana. It is located in Gandipet mandal of Rajendranagar revenue division.

Main Attraction in Gandipet is Gandipet Eco Park, This eco park was inaugurated by Telangana IT Minister Kalvakuntla Taraka Rama Rao.
 Another new landscape park at Gandipet on the banks of Hyderabad’s Osman Sagar lake was opened in 2022.

References

External links 
Gandipet Eco Park

Villages in Ranga Reddy district